Baptiste Couilloud (born 22 July 1997) is a French rugby union player. His position is scrum-half and he currently plays for Lyon OU in the Top 14.

International career
Couilloud was called up to the French national team for the first time ahead of France's second 2018 Six Nations Championship match against Scotland as a replacement for Antoine Dupont who was injured in the first match against Ireland. He made his debut two weeks later against Italy coming on for Maxime Machenaud in the 70th minute of an eventual 34–17 home victory.

International tries

References

External links
France profile at FFR
Lyon OU profile
L'Équipe profile

1997 births
Living people
Sportspeople from Lyon
French rugby union players
France international rugby union players
Lyon OU players
Rugby union scrum-halves